RAFO Masirah  is a military airport located on the island of Masirah in Oman.

Facilities

In the 1950s, it also included a 2 ft 0in Gauge railway.

Airlines and destinations

References

External links
 Masirah, Oman at GlobalSecurity.org
 
 

Airports in Oman
Royal Air Force of Oman